B. Anthony Bogues is a Caribbean  political theorist, intellectual historian, writer and curator and currently Director of the Center for the Study of Slavery & Justice at Brown University and the Asa Messer Professor of Humanities and Critical Theory.  He was an Honorary Research Professor at the University of Cape Town and is currently a visiting professor and curator at the Visual Identities in Art and Design Research Center, University of Johannesburg. He is also a Visiting professor of African and African Diaspora Thought  at the   Free University of Amsterdam ( VU )  

In 2012, Bogues was also the Distinguished Faculty Fellow, Marta Sutton Weeks Distinguished Visitor at Stanford University. He has written extensively on African and African Diaspora political theory and intellectual history, including works on C. L. R. James, Sylvia Wynter and George Lamming. Bogues curates and writes about Haitian art, and he was the curator of The Art of Haiti: Loas, History and Memory, an exhibition at Colorado Springs Museum (February 10, 2018–May 20, 2018).

Education
Bogues has a  PhD Political Theory, from the University of the West Indies, Mona (1994).

Books
 Caliban's Freedom: Early Political Thought of CLR James (Pluto Press, 1997) 
 Black Heretics, Black Prophets: Radical Political Intellectuals (Routledge, 2003) 
 After Man: The Critical Thought of Sylvia Wynter (Ian Randle Press, 2006) 
 Empire of Liberty: Freedom Power and Desire (Dartmouth College  Press, 2010) 
 The Aesthetics of Decolonization: The George Lamming Reader (Ian Randle Press, 2011) 
 From Revolution in the Tropics to Imagined Landscape: The Art of Edouard Duval Carrie (Perez Art Museum, 2014)
 Metamorphosis: The Art of Edouard Duval Carrie (Miami Contemporary Art Museum, 2018)
 The Art of Haiti: Loas, History and Memory (Colorado Springs Fine Arts Center, 2019)

References

Year of birth missing (living people)
Living people
Brown University faculty
American political scientists
21st-century American historians
21st-century American male writers
University of the West Indies alumni
American male non-fiction writers
Academic staff of the University of Johannesburg
Academic staff of the University of Cape Town